Michael Stokes may refer to:

 Michael Stokes (record producer) (born 1955), American record producer
 Michael Stokes (academic) (1933–2012), British professor of Greek
 Michael Stokes (photographer) (born 1963), American photographer
 Michael Stokes, software developer of Shareaza